Soho Conspiracy is a 1950 British musical drama film directed by Cecil H. Williamson and starring Jacques Labrecque, Zena Marshall and Peter Gawthorne.

Premise
A young man attempts to stage a charity concert in order to raise funds to refurbish a Soho church.

Production
The film was made as a second feature. It incorporates footage from the 1948 Italian film Mad About Opera (Follie per l'opera) for the climactic concert performance.

Cast
 Zena Marshall - Dora 
 Jacques Labrecque - Carlo Scala 
 Peter Gawthorne - Father Shaney 
 John Witty -  Guy 
 Max Harrison - Gondotti Brother 
 Syd Harrison - Gondotti Brother 
 Gino Bechi - Himself 
 Beniamino Gigli - Himself 
 Tito Gobbi - Himself 
 Tito Schipa - Himself

References

Bibliography
 Chibnall, Steve & McFarlane, Brian. The British 'B' Film. Palgrave MacMillan, 2009.

External links

1950 films
British musical drama films
1950s musical drama films
Films set in London
1950 drama films
British black-and-white films
1950s English-language films
1950s British films